Fos Provence Basket, also known as Fos-sur-mer, is a professional basketball team based in Fos-sur-mer, France. The team currently plays in the first tier LNB Pro A, after its promotion in the 2020–21 season. Home games are played in the Complexe sportif Parsemain, which has a capacity of 2,000 people.

History
The club was founded on 13 January 1972 as Frat Fosséenne by its founders Paul Bruyère and Jean Lovato.

On 18 January 2020, Fos received Saint-Quentin Basket-Ball at the Palais des Sports in Marseille and set its attendance record with 3,384 spectators.
 
On 15 June 2018, Fos Provence promoted to the first-tier LNB Pro A for the first time in history, after defeating Roanne in the finals of the promotion play-offs.

In the 2020–21 season, Provence won the Pro B championship again and was promoted.

Honours
LNB Pro B
Champions (1): 2020–21
Promoted (1): 2017–18

LNB Pro B Leaders Cup
Winners (1): 2021

Players

Current roster

Notable players
- Set a club record or won an individual award as a professional player.
- Played at least one official international match for his senior national team at any time.
 Jordan Aboudou
 Tariq Kirksay
 Abdoulaye M'Baye
 Samuel Haanpää 
 David Huertas 
 Lee Cummard
 Marcus Dove
 Malik Hairston
 Ron Lewis
 Jarvis Varnado

Season by season

References

External links
Official website

Basketball teams in France